Boogie-Doodle is a 1940 drawn-on-film visual music short by Norman McLaren, set to the boogie-woogie music of African-American jazz pianist Albert Ammons.

Though released by the National Film Board of Canada (NFB) in 1941, Boogie-Doodle was actually made by McLaren in New York City in 1940, a year before he was invited by John Grierson to Canada to found the NFB's animation unit. McLaren, who had been influenced by the hand-painted films of Len Lye, was in New York exploring the technique on a grant from the Solomon Guggenheim Foundation, creating Boogie-Doodle along with three other cameraless films: Dots, Loops and Stars and Stripes.

The animation in Boogie-Doodle coincides exactly with Ammon's musical piece, with McLaren's animation beginning at the very first bar and concluding at the final note.

References

External links
 
 

1940 films
1940 animated films
Animated films without speech
Films directed by Norman McLaren
Visual music
Jazz films
Drawn-on-film animated films
National Film Board of Canada animated short films
Canadian animated short films
Solomon R. Guggenheim Foundation
1940s animated short films
Animated musical films
Canadian musical films
1940s Canadian films